Sridhara is an Indian name.

References 
Andhra Brahmin sub-castes.